Pristimantis kareliae is a species of frog in the family Strabomantidae. It is endemic to the Cordillera de Mérida in Venezuela and known from the region of Mucubají.

Etymology
It also alludes to the Republic of Karelia, which is similarly rich with lakes as the type locality of this species.

Description
Adult males measure  and females  in snout–vent length. The head is slightly wider than it is long. The canthus rostralis is slightly concave and poorly defined. The tympanum is distinct. The fingers and toes have no webbing and only small discs. The dorsum is black or very dark grey. The throat and belly are grey with many grey or black spots.

Habitat and conservation
It occurs in the Sierra Nevada National Park.

References

kareliae
Frogs of South America
Amphibians of the Andes
Amphibians of Venezuela
Endemic fauna of Venezuela
Amphibians described in 2005
Taxa named by Enrique La Marca
Taxonomy articles created by Polbot